San Miguel de Acos District is one of twelve districts of the province Huaral in Peru.

History
The history of Acos, like other villages of Peru takes place in the Inca Empire. But then it appears as an urban village in the early 16th Century.

The year 1800 is when Acos becomes a town, and when Chinese arrived in Peru, Acos became a market.

Because of the law no. 12687 in Peru the San Miguel of Acos District was created. Since 11 May 1976, the district belongs to the Huaral Province.

Capital
The capital of the district is Acos. The capital city of the district is located 68 km east from the city of Huaral and to the left is the Chancay River.

Location and description
San Miguel of Acos has an altitude of 1,376 m. It belongs to the Yunga region where they harvest fruits like apples and peaches. From 1920 to 1950 the people harvested oranges, lemons and chirimoyas.

Area
The area of the district is 48,16 km2.

Administrative division

Populated areas
Urban
Acos, with 507 people.

Agricultural communities
The District of San Miguel de Acos has 3 communities:
 Acos: 2.139 hectares
 San Juan: 1.263 hectares
 Huascoy: 1.304 hectares

See also
 Lima Region

References

External links
  INEI Perú.